"In Santacruz, Diagnosed Home Sick" is a poem by the Indian English poet and novelist K Srilata. The poem won First Prize in the Eighth All India Poetry Competition conducted by The Poetry Society (India) in 1998. This was the first major literary award for Srilata, who subsequently won the Unison British Council Award and Charles Wallace Fellowship for Poetry.

Excerpts from the poem

At the gift shop by the wharf
I bought an indigo octopus
all arms...

I, a newcomer to this
out-of-the-way white-hippie town
settle into the sea.

 *****

My two-month hostility melts
even as I see what divides me from home
more clearly than I did from my airless plane.

The sea knows ways of connecting too,
fluidly hugging,
in long-armed benevolence,
the puzzle-edges of vast continents.

Comments and criticism

The poem has received critical acclaim since its first publication in 1998 in the book Emerging Voices and has since been widely anthologised. The poem has been frequently quoted in scholarly analysis of contemporary Indian English poetry. The poem has inspired many literary works of similar name.

See also
The Poetry Society (India)

Notes

External links
  Eighth National Poetry Competition 1998 – Award Winners
K Srilata – An Interview
Selected Poetry, K. Srilata
  India Writes – Contemporary Indian Poetry
  Anthology of Contemporary Indian Poetry
  K Srilata – Man Asian Literary Prize
"Popular Indian Poems"

Indian poems